Jorge Luis Aguilera Ruiz (born January 16, 1966 in Frank País, Holguín) is a retired male track and field sprinter from Cuba who won an Olympic bronze medal in 4 x 100 metres relay in Barcelona 1992. He specialized in the 100 metres event, and his personal best of 10.57 was set in Zürich, 1993.

Achievements

References

External 

1966 births
Living people
People from Frank País, Cuba
Cuban male sprinters
Athletes (track and field) at the 1991 Pan American Games
Athletes (track and field) at the 1992 Summer Olympics
Athletes (track and field) at the 1995 Pan American Games
Olympic athletes of Cuba
Olympic bronze medalists for Cuba
Olympic bronze medalists in athletics (track and field)
Pan American Games medalists in athletics (track and field)
Pan American Games gold medalists for Cuba
Universiade medalists in athletics (track and field)
Central American and Caribbean Games gold medalists for Cuba
Competitors at the 1990 Central American and Caribbean Games
Competitors at the 1993 Central American and Caribbean Games
Universiade bronze medalists for Cuba
Medalists at the 1992 Summer Olympics
Central American and Caribbean Games medalists in athletics
Medalists at the 1993 Summer Universiade
Medalists at the 1991 Pan American Games
Medalists at the 1995 Pan American Games
20th-century Cuban people